Hillcrest High School (Riverside, California) is a public high school in Riverside, California, United States. Students from Ysmael Villegas Middle School, Arizona Middle School and transfers attend Hillcrest.

History
Hillcrest High School was completed in 2011 for $105 million and intended to relieve the overcrowded La Sierra High School, but did not open until August 2012 because the school district lacked the $4 million yearly operating budget. It cost $1 million to keep the campus secure while closed.

Athletics
Hillcrest is a member of the California Interscholastic Federation (CIF) River Valley League along with Jurupa Valley High School, La Sierra High School, Norte Vista High School, Patriot High School and Ramona High School.

Rivals
The rivalry between Hillcrest and La Sierra is known by students by two names, the Battle of the Bridge and the Backyard Battle of the Bell. The winner of the varsity football game between the schools retains a trophy containing a bell for one year, until the next meeting.

References

Public high schools in California
High schools in Riverside, California
2012 establishments in California